Lac-Huron is an unorganized territory in the Canadian province of Quebec, located in the Rimouski-Neigette Regional County Municipality.

See also
 Rimouski River
 List of unorganized territories in Quebec

References

External links
 

Incorporated places in Bas-Saint-Laurent